Piotr Migoń is a Polish geomorphologist active at the university of Wrocław where he hold a chair as Professor of Geography. Migoń has specialized in the study of weathering, mass movements in mountains, long-term landscape evolution and the geomorphology of granite and sandstone areas. Most of his research has been carried out in the Sudetes and other parts of Central Europe. He is currently an International Association of Geomorphologists board member.

References 

Year of birth missing (living people)
Living people
Polish geomorphologists
Academic staff of the University of Wrocław